John Patrick Christopher Furie (born 13 May 1948) was an English professional association footballer of the 1960s. He played in the Football League for Gillingham, making 17 appearances.

References

1948 births
Living people
Footballers from Hammersmith
English footballers
Association football defenders
Gillingham F.C. players
Watford F.C. players
Chelmsford City F.C. players
Guildford City F.C. players
Wealdstone F.C. players
Oxhey Jets F.C. players
English Football League players